The Milwaukee Brewers' 2011 season was their 42nd season for the franchise in Milwaukee, the 14th in the National League, and 43rd overall. The Brewers posted a franchise-best record of 96–66, winning their first-ever National League Central Division title. The Brewers defeated the  Arizona Diamondbacks in five games in the first round of the playoffs and advanced to the National League Championship Series, where they lost in six games to the St. Louis Cardinals.

2010–11 offseason

Despite having arguably the best offense in the National League, the Brewers had struggled in 2010 due to lack of starting pitching as the Brewers had finished next-to-last in the league in team ERA. Vowing to the Brewer fans to get more starting pitching, GM Doug Melvin traded or released three of the team's most ineffective starters in Jeff Suppan, Dave Bush, and Doug Davis. The Brewers also tabbed John Axford as the Brewers new closer with the retirement of Trevor Hoffman.

In keeping with their vow of getting better starting pitching, the Brewers made a deal just hours into the Winter Meetings with the Toronto Blue Jays in acquiring starting pitcher Shaun Marcum in exchange for top prospect Brett Lawrie. The Brewers also were in the hunt for 2009 American League Cy Young Award winner Zack Greinke of the Kansas City Royals. On December 19, the Brewers reached a deal with the Royals. The Royals got Brewers' starting shortstop Alcides Escobar and prospects Lorenzo Cain, Jake Odorizzi, and Jeremy Jeffress in exchange for Greinke, shortstop Yuniesky Betancourt, and $2 million to cover the last year of Betancourt's contract. The arrival of Greinke created a wave of excitement in Milwaukee. In the first 72 hours after the trade had been announced, the Brewers sold 1,500 season tickets compared to only 800 sold in the previous two months, and sold almost 1.5 million individual tickets before Opening Day.

The Brewers also signed to the team veterans Takashi Saito and Mark Kotsay and made a last minute trade at the end of Spring training in sending Class-A prospect Cutter Dykstra to the Washington Nationals in exchange for outfielder Nyjer Morgan.

Regular season
With the trades for Shaun Marcum and Zack Greinke, the Brewers were tabbed by many experts as favorites to not only win the NL Central Division, but also contenders for the National League pennant. The first month was a bumpy road for the Brewers as they were without Greinke due to a basketball-related rib injury during Spring training. The team opened the season with four consecutive losses. By the end of April, the Brewers had fallen to 5th place in the NL Central, but came back to have an impressive May, by taking advantage of the struggles of division rivals Cincinnati Reds and St. Louis Cardinals. The Brewers had problems offensively but were carried by the efforts of All-Stars Ryan Braun, Prince Fielder, and Rickie Weeks. Nyjer Morgan, who was acquired via trade on March 27 from the Washington Nationals, took over center field for struggling Carlos Gomez. Morgan became a fan favorite in Milwaukee because of his alter-ego and bizarre antics.

By the All-Star break, the Brewers were tied with St. Louis for the division lead despite having the National League's worst road record (16–29). The Brewers had NL's best home record at (33–14) which gave them a respectable 49–43 record at the midpoint of the 2011 season.

To address some needed bullpen help, the Brewers made another big trade just hours after the All-Star Game, trading two Class A prospects to the New York Mets in exchange for ace reliever Francisco Rodríguez, and also made another trade before the end of the trade deadline for veteran infielder Jerry Hairston Jr., who became essential to the Brewers' success after All-Star second baseman Rickie Weeks suffered a bad ankle sprain in the last week of July and Carlos Gomez was lost with a shoulder injury.

The Brewers started to overcome their road woes after the All-Star Break when they went on an 11-game road trip to Arizona, Colorado, and San Francisco. The Brewers ended up having a modest 5–6 mark on the road trip and came back to sweep the floundering Cubs and Astros and take two out of three games against the Cardinals to win eight of a nine-game homestand and take over 1st place in the NL Central. They followed the successful homestand with a sweep of the Astros in Houston; the first time they have swept the Astros away from Milwaukee, and also took 2 out of 3 games in St. Louis to extend the Brewers division lead to 7 games. The Brewers went on to have a stretch of 29 games from late July to mid August where they went 23–6 and finished the month of August with a 21–7 mark, setting a franchise record for most wins in one month.

The Brewers went through a series of scuffles in early September where their division lead, which had been up as high as 10 games in late August, went down to as few as 4.5 games as the Cardinals went on a sudden hot streak, becoming the first team to sweep the Brewers at Miller Park during the season. The Brewers, though, were able to keep their division lead steady, thanks to a mid-September sweep of the Reds.

On September 16, Ryan Braun hit his 30th home run of the season. Along with his 31 stolen bases, Braun became only the 2nd Brewer ever to have a 30-homer, 30-steal season, joining Tommy Harper, who accomplished the feat in 1970.

The Brewers came into their final 6 games with a 5-game lead over the Cardinals. On September 23, the Brewers beat the Florida Marlins 4–1, with Ryan Braun hitting a clutch 3-run homer in the 8th. In St. Louis, the Cardinals fell to the Cubs 5–1, giving the Brewers the NL Central Division title, their first division title since 1982. The Brewers also became the first franchise ever to win a division title in both the American and National leagues.

The night drew eerie echoes to the Brewers playoff year of 2008, as the Brewers that year needed to beat the Cubs and needed the Marlins to win to get into the playoffs, whereas it was vice versa in 2011, with the Brewers needing to beat the Marlins and for the Cubs to win to get into the playoffs. And like in 2008, Ryan Braun hit the clutch, game-winning home run for the Brewers.

On September 28, the final game of the season, the Brewers beat the Pirates 7–3, which was also their 96th win of the season, breaking the team record for wins in a season set in 1979 and tied in 1982. The Brewers finished the season 96–66, the second best record in the National League behind only the Philadelphia Phillies.

Along with their team accomplishments, the Brewers had many individual achievements from their players. Ryan Braun finished the season with 33 homers and 33 steals while finishing second in the National League in batting average, hitting .332 while Prince Fielder finished second in the league in both home runs and RBIs, hitting 38 home runs while driving in 120.

The Brewers starting pitching was also drastically better than 2010. Each of the Brewers 5 regular starters had 10-plus wins during the regular season. Yovani Gallardo won 17 games, the most by a Brewer since 2005, Zack Greinke won 16 games despite missing one month, both Shawn Marcum and Randy Wolf won 13 games, and number five starter Chris Narveson won 11 games. It was the first time since 1982 that the Brewers had five pitchers with 10 or more wins in a season. The Brewers also used fewer starting pitchers than any team in baseball, using only six starting pitchers, with Marco Estrada filling in for 7 games when Greinke and later Narveson were out with injuries.

The Brewers bullpen was also stellar, led by closer John Axford, who set two new club records with most consecutive converted saves (42) and most saves in a season (46).

The Brewers faced the Arizona Diamondbacks in the NLDS and won the first two games at Miller Park. The Brewers however got shelled by the Diamondbacks in games 3 and 4 in Arizona, and the series and season came down to Game 5 at Miller Park. The Brewers won the game in extra innings 3–2 to give the Brewers their first postseason series win since the 1982 ALCS.

The Brewers then faced their division rivals, the St. Louis Cardinals, in the NLCS, in a rematch of the 1982 World Series. The Brewers staged a come-from-behind victory, winning game one of the best-of-seven series by a score of 9–6. St. Louis however went on to pound the Brewers 13–2 in Game Two and scored 4 runs in the first inning of Game 3 to take the game, 4–3. The Brewers won Game 4 in St. Louis, however, they then lost the next two games to surrender the National League Pennant to the Cardinals.

Season standings

Record vs. Opponents

Playoffs

National League Division Series: Arizona Diamondbacks vs. Milwaukee Brewers

National League Championship Series: St. Louis Cardinals vs. Milwaukee Brewers

Game log

|- align="center" bgcolor="ffbbbb"
| 1 || March 31 || @ Reds || 7–6 || Ondrusek (1–0) || Axford (0–1) || || 42,398 || 0–1
|- align="center" bgcolor="ffbbbb"
| 2 || April 2 || @ Reds || 4–2 || Wood (1–0) || Marcum (0–1) || Cordero (1) || 37,967 || 0–2
|- align="center" bgcolor="ffbbbb"
| 3 || April 3 || @ Reds || 12–3 || Arroyo (1–0) || Wolf (0–1) || || 24,805 || 0–3
|- align="center" bgcolor="ffbbbb"
| 4 || April 4 || Braves || 2–1 || Moylan (1–0) || Saito (0–1) || Kimbrel (1) || 46,017 || 0–4
|- align="center" bgcolor="bbffbb"
| 5 || April 5 || Braves || 1–0 || Gallardo (1–0) || Lowe (1–1) || || 24,117 || 1–4
|- align="center" bgcolor="bbffbb"
| 6 || April 6 || Braves || 5–4 || Estrada (1–0) || Minor (0–1) || Axford (1) || 23,420 || 2–4
|- align="center" bgcolor="bbffbb"
| 7 || April 7 || Braves || 4–2 || Marcum (1–1) || Hanson (0–1) || Axford (2) || 24,645 || 3–4
|- align="center" bgcolor="ffbbbb"
| 8 || April 8 || Cubs || 7–4 || Zambrano (1–0) || Wolf (0–2) || Mármol (3) || 34,310 || 3–5
|- align="center" bgcolor="bbffbb"
| 9 || April 9 || Cubs || 6–0 || Narveson (1–0) || Garza (0–1) || || 42,478 || 4–5
|- align="center" bgcolor="bbffbb"
| 10 || April 10 || Cubs || 6–5 || Loe (1–0) || Wood (0–1) || Axford (3) || 37,193 || 5–5
|- align="center" bgcolor="bbbbbb"
| – || April 12 || @ Pirates || colspan=6| Postponed (rain); Makeup: August 22
|- align="center" bgcolor="bbffbb"
| 11 || April 13 || @ Pirates || 6–0 || Marcum (2–1) || Correia (2–1) || || 8,755 || 6–5
|- align="center" bgcolor="bbffbb"
| 12 || April 14 || @ Pirates || 4–1 || Wolf (1–2) || Maholm (0–2) || || 10,517 || 7–5
|- align="center" bgcolor="ffbbbb"
| 13 || April 15 || @ Nationals || 4–3 (10) || Gaudin (1–1) || Braddock (0–1) || || 17,217 || 7–6
|- align="center" bgcolor="bbbbbb"
| – || April 16 || @ Nationals || colspan=6| Postponed (rain); Makeup: April 17
|- align="center" bgcolor="ffbbbb"
| 14 || April 17 || @ Nationals || 8–4 || Marquis (1–0) || Gallardo (1–1)|| || n/a || 7–7
|- align="center" bgcolor="ffbbbb"
| 15 || April 17 || @ Nationals || 5–1 || Hernández (2–1) || Loe (1–1) || Storen (1) || 23,047 || 7–8
|- align="center" bgcolor="bbffbb"
| 16 || April 18 || @ Phillies || 6–3 (12) || Kintzler (1–0) || Kendrick (0–1) || || 45,637 || 8–8
|- align="center" bgcolor="bbffbb"
| 17 || April 19 || @ Phillies || 9–0 || Wolf (2–2) || Halladay (2–1) || || 45,408 || 9–8
|- align="center" bgcolor="ffbbbb"
| 18 || April 20 || @ Phillies || 4–3 || Madson (2–0) || Kintzler (1–1) || Contreras (4) || 45,743 || 9–9
|- align="center" bgcolor="bbffbb"
| 19 || April 22 || Astros || 14–7 || Gallardo (2–1) || Figueroa (0–3) || || 31,907|| 10–9
|- align="center" bgcolor="ffbbbb"
| 20 || April 23 || Astros || 9–6 (10) || Lyon (1–1) || Green (0–1) || || 37,065 || 10–10
|- align="center" bgcolor="bbffbb"
| 21 || April 24 || Astros || 4–1 || Wolf (3–2) || Rodríguez (1–3) || Axford (4) || 32,323 || 11–10
|- align="center" bgcolor="ffbbbb"
| 22 || April 25 || Reds || 9–5 || Arroyo (3–2) || Narveson (1–1) || || 35,794 || 11–11
|- align="center" bgcolor="bbffbb"
| 23 || April 26 || Reds || 3–2 || Loe (2–1) || Ondrusek 2–2 || Axford (5) || 37,062 || 12–11
|- align="center" bgcolor="ffbbbb"
| 24 || April 27 || Reds || 7–6 (10) || Chapman (2–0) || Mitre (0–1) || Cordero (4) || 33,848 || 12–12
|- align="center" bgcolor="bbffbb"
| 25 || April 29 || @ Astros || 5–0 || Marcum (3–1) || Myers (1–1)|| || 25,734 || 13–12
|- align="center" bgcolor="ffbbbb"
| 26 || April 30 || @ Astros || 2–1 || Lyon (3–1) || Loe (2–2) || || 26,514 || 13–13

|- align="center" bgcolor="ffbbbb"
| 27 || May 1 || @ Astros || 5–0 || Norris (2–1) || Narveson (1–2) || || 23,908 || 13–14
|- align="center" bgcolor="ffbbbb"
| 28 || May 2 || @ Braves || 6–2 || Jurrjens (3–0) || Gallardo (2–2) || || 14,126 || 13–15
|- align="center" bgcolor="bbbbbb"
| – || May 3 || @ Braves || colspan=6| Postponed (rain); Makeup: May 4
|- align="center" bgcolor="ffbbbb"
| 29 || May 4 || @ Braves || 8–3 || Hanson (4–3) || Estrada (1–1) || || n/a || 13–16
|- align="center" bgcolor="ffbbbb"
| 30 || May 4 || @ Braves || 8–0 || Hudson (4–2) || Greinke (0–1) || || 15,543 || 13–17
|- align="center" bgcolor="ffbbbb"
| 31 || May 5 || @ Braves || 2–1 || Venters (2–0) || Loe (2–3) || Kimbrel (7)|| 15,307 || 13–18
|- align="center" bgcolor="ffbbbb"
| 32 || May 6 || @ Cardinals || 6–0 || García (4–0) || Wolf (3–3)|| || 35,552 || 13–19
|- align="center" bgcolor="bbffbb"
| 33 || May 7 || @ Cardinals || 4–0 || Gallardo (3–2) || Lohse (4–2) || || 40,229 || 14–19
|- align="center" bgcolor="ffbbbb"
| 34 || May 8 || @ Cardinals || 3–1 || McClellan (5–0) || Narveson (1–3) || Salas (3) || 40,125 || 14–20
|- align="center" bgcolor="bbffbb"
| 35 || May 9 || Padres || 4–3 || Greinke (1–1) || Latos (0–5) || Axford (6) || 27,058 || 15–20
|- align="center" bgcolor="bbffbb"
| 36 || May 10 || Padres || 8–6 || Marcum (4–1) || Richard (1–4) || Axford (7) || 22,861 || 16–20
|- align="center" bgcolor="ffbbbb"
| 37 || May 11 || Padres || 13–6 || Qualls (2–2) || Loe (2–4) || || 25,652 || 16–21
|- align="center" bgcolor="bbffbb"
| 38 || May 13 || Pirates || 5–2 || Gallardo (4–2) || McDonald (2–3) || Axford (8) || 32,837 || 17–21
|- align="center" bgcolor="bbffbb"
| 39 || May 14 || Pirates || 8–2 || Narveson (2–3) || Karstens (2–2) || || 42,422 || 18–21
|- align="center" bgcolor="bbffbb"
| 40 || May 15 || Pirates || 9–6 || Greinke (2–1) || Correia (5–4) || || 37,059 || 19–21
|- align="center" bgcolor="bbffbb"
| 41 || May 16 || @ Dodgers || 2–1 || Marcum (5–1) || Garland (1–3) || Axford (9) || 35,346 || 20–21
|- align="center" bgcolor="ffbbbb"
| 42 || May 17 || @ Dodgers || 3–0 || Kuroda (5–3) || Wolf (3–4) || Guerrier (1) || 42,138 || 20–22
|- align="center" bgcolor="bbffbb"
| 43 || May 18 || @ Padres || 5–2 || Gallardo (5–2) || Moseley (1–6) || Axford (10) || 16,901 || 21–22
|- align="center" bgcolor="ffbbbb"
| 44 || May 19 || @ Padres || 1–0 || Bell (2–0) || Estrada (1–2) || || 16,286 || 21–23
|- align="center" bgcolor="bbffbb"
| 45 || May 20 || Rockies || 7–6 (14) || McClendon (1–0) || Paulino (0–4) || || 33,361 || 22–23
|- align="center" bgcolor="bbffbb"
| 46 || May 21 || Rockies || 3–2 || Marcum (6–1) || Mortensen (1–1) || Axford (11) || 42,240 || 23–23
|- align="center" bgcolor="bbffbb"
| 47 || May 22 || Rockies || 3–1 || Wolf (4–4) || Jiménez (0–4) || Axford (12) || 42,605 || 24–23
|- align="center" bgcolor="bbffbb"
| 48 || May 23 || Nationals || 11–3 || Gallardo (6–2) || Gorzelanny (2–4) || || 22,906 || 25–23
|- align="center" bgcolor="bbffbb"
| 49 || May 24 || Nationals || 7–6 || McClendon (2–0) || Rodríguez (1–1) || Axford (13) || 24,722 || 26–23
|- align="center" bgcolor="bbffbb"
| 50 || May 25 || Nationals || 6–4 || Greinke (3–1) || Marquis (5–2) || Loe (1) || 34,419 || 27–23
|- align="center" bgcolor="ffbbbb"
| 51 || May 27 || Giants || 5–4 || Lincecum (5–4) || Marcum (6–2) || Wilson (14) || 37,034 || 27–24
|- align="center" bgcolor="bbffbb"
| 52 || May 28 || Giants || 3–2 || Axford (1–1) || Mota (2–2) || || 42,512 || 28–24
|- align="center" bgcolor="bbffbb"
| 53 || May 29 || Giants || 6–0 || Gallardo (7–2) || Cain (3–4) || || 43,035 || 29–24
|- align="center" bgcolor="ffbbbb"
| 54 || May 30 || @ Reds || 7–3 || Wood (4–3) || Narveson (2–4) || || 21,564 || 29–25
|- align="center" bgcolor="bbffbb"
| 55 || May 31 || @ Reds || 7–2 || Greinke (4–1) || Reineke (0–1) || || 14,294 || 30–25

|- align="center" bgcolor="ffbbbb"
| 56 || June 1 || @ Reds || 4–3 || Masset (1–3) || Loe (2–5) || Cordero (10) || 22,213 || 30–26
|- align="center" bgcolor="bbffbb"
| 57 || June 3 || @ Marlins || 6–5 || McClendon (3–0) || Núñez (0–2) || Axford (14) || 15,315 || 31–26
|- align="center" bgcolor="bbffbb"
| 58 || June 4 || @ Marlins || 3–2 || Gallardo (8–2) || Volstad (2–5) || Axford (15) || 17,200 || 32–26
|- align="center" bgcolor="bbffbb"
| 59 || June 5 || @ Marlins || 6–5 (11) || Dillard (1–0) || Dunn (4–3) || Axford (16) || 13,208 || 33–26
|- align="center" bgcolor="bbffbb"
| 60 || June 6 || @ Marlins || 7–2 || Greinke (5–1) || Vázquez (3–5) || || 12,404 || 34–26
|- align="center" bgcolor="ffbbbb"
| 61 || June 7 || Mets || 2–1 || Capuano (4–6) || Estrada (1–3) || Rodríguez (17) || 27,064 || 34–27
|- align="center" bgcolor="bbffbb"
| 62 || June 8 || Mets || 7–6 || Axford (2–1) || Thayer (0–1) || || 26,114 || 35–27
|- align="center" bgcolor="ffbbbb"
| 63 || June 9 || Mets || 4–1 || Niese (5–5) || Gallardo (8–3) || Rodríguez (18) || 30,632 || 35–28
|- align="center" bgcolor="bbffbb"
| 64 || June 10 || Cardinals || 8–0 || Narveson (3–4) || Lohse (7–3) || || 33,240 || 36–28
|- align="center" bgcolor="bbffbb"
| 65 || June 11 || Cardinals || 5–3 || Greinke (6–1) || Carpenter (1–6) || Axford (17) || 41,930 || 37–28
|- align="center" bgcolor=" bgcolor="bbffbb"
| 66 || June 12 || Cardinals || 4–3 || Marcum (7–2) || Westbrook (6–4) || Axford (18) || 42,692 || 38–28
|- align="center" bgcolor="ffbbbb"
| 67 || June 13 ||  @ Cubs || 1–0 || Samardzija (4–2) || Loe (2–6) || Mármol (13) || 39,070 || 38–29
|- align="center" bgcolor="ffbbbb"
| 68 || June 14 ||  @ Cubs || 5–4 (10) || Samardzija (5–2) || Dillard (1–1) || || 39,151 || 38–30
|- align="center" bgcolor="bbffbb"
| 69 || June 15 ||  @ Cubs || 9–5 || Narveson (4–4) || Zambrano (5–4) || || 39,821 || 39–30
|- align="center" bgcolor="ffbbbb"
| 70 || June 16 || @ Cubs || 12–7 || Garza (3–6) || Greinke (6–2) || || 40,024 || 39–31
|- align="center" bgcolor="ffbbbb"
| 71 || June 17 || @ Red Sox || 10–4 || Lackey (5–5) || Estrada (1–4) || || 37,833 || 39–32
|- align="center" bgcolor="bbffbb"
| 72 || June 18 || @ Red Sox || 4–2 || Wolf (5–4) || Lester (9–3) || Axford (19) || 38,175 || 40–32
|- align="center" bgcolor="ffbbbb"
| 73 || June 19 || @ Red Sox || 12–3 || Wakefield (4–2) || Gallardo (8–4) || || 37,903 || 40–33
|- align="center" bgcolor="ffbbbb"
| 74 || June 20 || Rays || 8–4 || Niemann (2–4) || Narveson (4–5) || || 35,495 || 40–34
|- align="center" bgcolor="bbffbb"
| 75 || June 21 || Rays || 5–1 || Greinke (7–2) || Hellickson (7–6) || || 40,079 || 41–34
|- align="center" bgcolor="ffbbbb"
| 76 || June 22 || Rays || 6–3 || Price (8–6) || Estrada (1–5) || || 39,632 || 41–35
|- align="center" bgcolor="bbffbb"
| 77 || June 24 || Twins || 4–3 || Wolf (6–4) || Baker (5–5) || Axford (20) || 39,819 || 42–35
|- align="center" bgcolor="bbffbb"
| 78 || June 25 || Twins || 11–1 || Gallardo (9–4) || Liriano (4–7) || || 43,980 || 43–35
|- align="center" bgcolor="bbffbb"
| 79 || June 26 || Twins || 6–2 || Narveson (5–5) || Pavano (5–6) || || 41,624 || 44–35
|- align="center" bgcolor="ffbbbb"
| 80 || June 28 || @ Yankees || 12–2 || García (7–6) || Greinke (7–3) || || 45,575 || 44–36
|- align="center" bgcolor="ffbbbb"
| 81 || June 29 || @ Yankees || 5–2 || Burnett (8–6) || Marcum (7–3) || Rivera (21) || 46,450 || 44–37
|- align="center" bgcolor="ffbbbb"
| 82 || June 30 || @ Yankees || 5–0 || Sabathia (11–4) || Wolf (6–5) || || 46,903 || 44–38

|- align="center" bgcolor="ffbbbb"
| 83 || July 1 || @ Twins || 6–2 || Liriano (5–7) || Gallardo (9–5) || || 40,812 || 44–39
|- align="center" bgcolor="bbffbb"
| 84 || July 2 || @ Twins || 8–7 || Saito (1–1) || Capps (2–4) || Axford (21) || 41,378 || 45–39
|- align="center" bgcolor="ffbbbb"
| 85 || July 3 || @ Twins || 9–7 || Dumatrait (1–1) || Loe (2–7) || Perkins (1) || 41,195 || 45–40
|- align="center" bgcolor="ffbbbb"
| 86 || July 4 || Diamondbacks || 8–6 || Demel (2–2) || Axford (2–2) || Hernandez (4) || 41,622 || 45–41
|- align="center" bgcolor="ffbbbb"
| 87 || July 5 || Diamondbacks || 7–3 || Duke (2–3) || Wolf (6–6) || Hernandez (5) || 34,014 || 45–42
|- align="center" bgcolor="bbffbb"
| 88 || July 6 || Diamondbacks || 3–1 || Gallardo (10–5)  || Paterson (0–2) || Axford (22) || 36,470 || 46–42
|- align="center" bgcolor="bbffbb"
| 89 || July 7 || Reds || 5–4 || Narveson (6–5) || Bailey (3–4) || Axford (23) || 34,102 || 47–42
|- align="center" bgcolor="bbffbb"
| 90 || July 8 || Reds || 8–7 || Estrada (2–5) || Cordero (3–2) || || 39,050 || 48–42
|- align="center" bgcolor="ffbbbb"
| 91 || July 9 || Reds || 8–4 (10) || Bray (2–1) || Estrada (2–6) || || 43,119 || 48–43
|- align="center" bgcolor="bbffbb"
| 92 || July 10 || Reds || 4–3 || Loe (3–7) || Cordero (3–3) || || 43,896 || 49–43
|- align="center" bgcolor="ffbbbb"
| 93 || July 14 || @ Rockies || 12–3 || Jiménez (5–8) || Gallardo (10–6) || || 41,088 || 49–44
|- align="center" bgcolor="ffbbbb"
| 94 || July 15 || @ Rockies || 4–0 || Nicasio (4–2) || Narveson (6–6) || || 35,044 || 49–45
|- align="center" bgcolor="bbffbb"
| 95 || July 16 || @ Rockies || 8–7 || Rodríguez (3–2) || Street (0–3) || Axford (24) || 46,783 || 50–45
|- align="center" bgcolor="bbffbb"
| 96 || July 17 || @ Rockies || 4–3 || Marcum (8–3) || Cook (0–5) || Axford (25) || 35,030 || 51–45
|- align="center" bgcolor="ffbbbb"
| 97 || July 18 || @ Diamondbacks || 3–0 || Collmenter (5–5) || Wolf (6–7) || Hernandez (9) || 17,404 || 51–46
|- align="center" bgcolor="bbffbb"
| 98 || July 19 || @ Diamondbacks || 11–3 || Gallardo (11–6) || Enright (1–4) || || 17,831 || 52–46
|- align="center" bgcolor="bbffbb"
| 99 || July 20 || @ Diamondbacks || 5–2 (10) || Saito (2–1) || Cook (0–1) || Axford (26) || 19,196 || 53–46
|- align="center" bgcolor="ffbbbb"
| 100 || July 21 || @ Diamondbacks || 4–0 || Kennedy (11–3) || Greinke (7–4) || || 22,241 || 53–47
|- align="center" bgcolor="bbffbb"
| 101 || July 22 || @ Giants || 4–2 || Marcum (9–3) || Cain (8–6) || Axford (27) || 42,297 || 54–47
|- align="center" bgcolor="ffbbbb"
| 102 || July 23 || @ Giants || 4–2 || Vogelsong (8–1) || Wolf (6–8) || Wilson (30) || 42,277 || 54–48
|- align="center" bgcolor="ffbbbb"
| 103 || July 24 || @ Giants || 2–1 || Bumgarner (6–9) || Gallardo (11–7) || Wilson (31) || 42,262 || 54–49
|- align="center" bgcolor="bbffbb"
| 104 || July 26 || Cubs || 3–2 || Narveson (7–6) || Dempster (7–8) || Axford (28) || 39,183 || 55–49
|- align="center" bgcolor="bbffbb"
| 105 || July 27 || Cubs || 2–0 || Greinke (8–4) || Zambrano (7–6) || Axford (29) || 39,233 || 56–49
|- align="center" bgcolor="bbffbb"
| 106 || July 28 || Cubs || 4–2 || Marcum (10–3) || Wells (2–4) || Axford (30) || 40,008 || 57–49
|- align="center" bgcolor="bbffbb"
| 107 || July 29 || Astros || 4–0 || Wolf (7–8) || Lyles (0–6) || || 41,672 || 58–49
|- align="center" bgcolor="bbffbb"
| 108 || July 30 || Astros || 6–2 || Gallardo (12–7) || Happ (4–13) || || 44,306 || 59–49
|- align="center" bgcolor="bbffbb"
| 109 || July 31 || Astros || 5–4 || Rodríguez (4–2) || Rodríguez (2–1) || Axford (31) || 41,738 || 60–49

|- align="center" bgcolor="bbffbb"
| 110 || August 1 || Cardinals || 6–2 || Greinke (9–4) || Carpenter (6–8) || || 41,619 || 61–49
|- align="center" bgcolor="ffbbbb"
| 111 || August 2 || Cardinals || 8–7 (11) || McClellan (8–6) || Estrada (2–7) || Dotel (2) || 39,393 || 61–50
|- align="center" bgcolor="bbffbb"
| 112 || August 3 || Cardinals || 10–5 || Wolf (8–8) || Jackson (8–8) || || 41,906 || 62–50
|- align="center" bgcolor="bbffbb"
| 113 || August 5 || @ Astros || 8–1 || Gallardo (13–7) || Happ (4–14) || || 25,811 || 63–50
|- align="center" bgcolor="bbffbb"
| 114 || August 6 || @ Astros || 7–5 || Narveson (8–6) || Myers (3–12) || Axford (32) || 30,561 || 64–50
|- align="center" bgcolor="bbffbb"
| 115 || August 7 || @ Astros || 7–3 || Greinke (10–4) || Norris (5–8) || || 22,885 || 65–50
|- align="center" bgcolor="bbffbb"
| 116 || August 9 || @ Cardinals || 5–3 (10) || Hawkins (1–0) || Dotel (2–2) || Axford (33) || 40,626 || 66–50
|- align="center" bgcolor="bbffbb"
| 117 || August 10 || @ Cardinals || 5–1 || Wolf (9–8) || Westbrook (9–6) || || 38,397 || 67–50
|- align="center" bgcolor="ffbbbb"
| 118 || August 11 || @ Cardinals || 5–2 || Carpenter (8–8) || Gallardo (13–8) || Salas (22) || 38,302 || 67–51
|- align="center" bgcolor="bbffbb"
| 119 || August 12 || Pirates || 7–2 || Greinke (11–4) || Maholm (6–13) || || 41,820 || 68–51
|- align="center" bgcolor="bbffbb"
| 120 || August 13 || Pirates || 1–0 || Estrada (3–7) || Correia (12–11) || Axford (34) || 43,214 || 69–51
|- align="center" bgcolor="bbffbb"
| 121 || August 14 || Pirates || 2–1 (10) || Saito (3–1) || Resop (3–4) || || 45,103 || 70–51
|- align="center" bgcolor="bbffbb"
| 122 || August 15 || Dodgers || 3–0 || Wolf (10–8) || Lilly (7–13) || Axford (35) || 38,551 || 71–51
|- align="center" bgcolor="bbffbb"
| 123 || August 16 || Dodgers || 2–1 || Saito (4–1) || Kuo (0–2) || || 37,083 || 72–51
|- align="center" bgcolor="bbffbb"
| 124 || August 17 || Dodgers || 3–1 || Greinke (12–4) || Eovaldi (1–1) || Axford (36) || 42,804 || 73–51
|- align="center" bgcolor="ffbbbb"
| 125 || August 18 || Dodgers || 5–1 || Kershaw (15–5) || Estrada (3–8) || || 42,873 || 73–52
|- align="center" bgcolor="bbffbb"
| 126 || August 19 || @ Mets || 6–1 || Marcum (11–3) || Pelfrey (6–10) || || 24,470 || 74–52
|- align="center" bgcolor="bbffbb"
| 127 || August 20 || @ Mets || 11–9 || Rodríguez (5–2) || Isringhausen (3–3) || Axford (37) || 28,234 || 75–52
|- align="center" bgcolor="bbffbb"
| 128 || August 21 || @ Mets || 6–2 || Gallardo (14–8) || Acosta (1–1) || || 25,949 || 76–52
|- align="center" bgcolor="bbffbb"
| 129 || August 22 || @ Pirates || 8–1 || Narveson (9–6) || Karstens (9–7) || || n/a || 77–52
|- align="center" bgcolor="ffbbbb"
| 130 || August 22 || @ Pirates || 9–2 || McCutchen (4–3) || Greinke (12–5) || || 19,380 || 77–53
|- align="center" bgcolor="bbffbb"
| 131 || August 23 || @ Pirates || 11–4 || Estrada (4–8) || Ohlendorf (0–1) || || 21,411 || 78–53
|- align="center" bgcolor="ffbbbb"
| 132 || August 24 || @ Pirates || 2–0 || Grilli (1–0) || Marcum (11–4) || Hanrahan (32) || 18,013 || 78–54
|- align="center" bgcolor="bbffbb"
| 133 || August 26 || Cubs || 5–2 || Wolf (11–8) || López (4–5) || Axford (38) || 41,661 || 79–54
|- align="center" bgcolor="bbffbb"
| 134 || August 27 || Cubs || 6–4 || Gallardo (15–8) || Dempster (10–10) || Axford (39) || 44,091 || 80–54
|- align="center" bgcolor="bbffbb"
| 135 || August 28 || Cubs || 3–2 || Greinke (13–5) || Coleman (2–7) || Axford (40) || 41,883 || 81–54
|- align="center" bgcolor="ffbbbb"
| 136 || August 30 || Cardinals || 2–1 || Jackson (11–9) || Marcum (11–5) || Salas (23) || 42,384 || 81–55
|- align="center" bgcolor="ffbbbb"
| 137 || August 31 || Cardinals || 8–3 || Westbrook (11–7) || Wolf (11–9) || || 38,073 || 81–56

|- align="center" bgcolor="ffbbbb"
| 138 || September 1 || Cardinals || 8–4 || Dotel (3–3) || Gallardo (15–9) || || 34,080 || 81–57
|- align="center" bgcolor="bbffbb"
| 139 || September 2 || @ Astros || 8–2 || Greinke (14–5) || Rodríguez (1–6) || || 20,045 || 82–57
|- align="center" bgcolor="bbffbb"
| 140 || September 3 || @ Astros || 8–2 || Narveson (10–6) || Norris (6–9) || || 24,982 || 83–57
|- align="center" bgcolor="bbffbb"
| 141 || September 4 || @ Astros || 4–0 || Marcum (12–5) || Rodríguez (10–10) || || 21,976 || 84–57
|- align="center" bgcolor="bbffbb"
| 142 || September 5 || @ Cardinals || 4–1 || Wolf (12–9) || Westbrook (11–8) || Axford (41) || 42,043 || 85–57
|- align="center" bgcolor="ffbbbb"
| 143 || September 6 || @ Cardinals || 4–2 || Lohse (13–8) || Gallardo (15–10) || Motte (3) || 35,397 || 85–58
|- align="center" bgcolor="ffbbbb"
| 144 || September 7 || @ Cardinals || 2–0 || Carpenter (9–9) || Greinke (14–6) || || 38,891 || 85–59
|- align="center" bgcolor="ffbbbb"
| 145 || September 8 || Phillies || 7–2 || Hamels (14–7) || Narveson (10–7) || || 41,646 || 85–60
|- align="center" bgcolor="ffbbbb"
| 146 || September 9 || Phillies || 5–3 || Halladay (17–5) || Marcum (12–6) || Madson (29) || 43,283 || 85–61
|- align="center" bgcolor="ffbbbb"
| 147 || September 10 || Phillies || 3–2 (10) || Stutes (6–1) || Hawkins (1–1) || Madson (30) || 42,967 || 85–62
|- align="center" bgcolor="bbffbb"
| 148 || September 11 || Phillies || 3–2 || Gallardo (16–10) || Worley (11–2) || Axford (42) || 42,388 || 86–62
|- align="center" bgcolor="bbffbb"
| 149 || September 13 || Rockies || 2–1 (11) || Loe (4–7) || Lindstrom (2–2) || || 37,120 || 87–62
|- align="center" bgcolor="ffbbbb"
| 150 || September 14 || Rockies || 6–2 || Millwood (3–2) || Marcum (12–7) || || 38,302 || 87–63
|- align="center" bgcolor="bbffbb"
| 151 || September 16 || @ Reds || 6–3 || Wolf (13–9) || Arroyo (8–12) || Axford (43) || 32,506 || 88–63
|- align="center" bgcolor="bbffbb"
| 152 || September 17 || @ Reds || 10–1 || Gallardo (17–10) || Vólquez (5–6) || || 39,766 || 89–63
|- align="center" bgcolor="bbffbb"
| 153 || September 18 || @ Reds || 8–1 || Greinke (15–6) || Maloney (0–3) || || 37,845 || 90–63
|- align="center" bgcolor="ffbbbb"
| 154 || September 19 || @ Cubs || 5–2 || Coleman (3–8) || Narveson (10–8) || || 35,076 || 90–64
|- align="center" bgcolor="bbffbb"
| 155 || September 20 || @ Cubs || 5–1 || Marcum (13–7) || Wells (7–5) || || 36,571 || 91–64
|- align="center" bgcolor="ffbbbb"
| 156 || September 21 || @ Cubs || 7–1 || Garza (9–10) || Wolf (13–10) || || 30,965 || 91–65
|- align="center" bgcolor="bbffbb"
| 157 || September 23 || Marlins || 4–1 || Rodríguez (6–2) || Hensley (6–7) || Axford (44) || 44,584 || 92–65
|- align="center" bgcolor="bbffbb"
| 158 || September 24 || Marlins || 6–4 || Hawkins (2–1) || Badenhop (2–3) || Axford (45) || 44,520 || 93–65
|- align="center" bgcolor="bbffbb"
| 159 || September 25 || Marlins || 9–5 || Narveson (11–8) || Nolasco (10–12) || || 43,347 || 94–65
|- align="center" bgcolor="ffbbbb"
| 160 || September 26 || Pirates || 9–8 || McCutchen (5–3) || Saito (4–2) || Hanrahan (40) || 41,222 || 94–66
|- align="center" bgcolor="bbffbb"
| 161 || September 27 || Pirates || 6–4 || Hawkins (3–1) || Hughes (0–1)|| Axford (46) || 41,864 || 95–66
|- align="center" bgcolor="bbffbb"
| 162 || September 28 || Pirates || 7–3 || Greinke (16–6) || Locke (0–3) || || 41,976 || 96–66
|- 

|   

Source:

|- align="center" bgcolor="bbffbb"
| 1 || October 1 || Diamondbacks || 4–1 || Gallardo (1–0) || Kennedy (0–1) || Axford (1) || 44,122 || 1–0
|- align="center" bgcolor="bbffbb"
| 2 || October 2 || Diamondbacks || 9–4 || Saito (1–0) || Hudson (0–1) ||  || 44,066 || 2–0 
|- align="center" bgcolor="ffbbbb"
| 3 || October 4 || @ Diamondbacks || 8–1 || Collmenter (1–0) || Marcum (0–1) ||  || 48,312 || 2–1
|- align="center" bgcolor="ffbbbb"
| 4 || October 5 || @ Diamondbacks || 10–6 || Owings (1–0) || Wolf (0–1) ||  || 38,830 || 2–2
|- align="center" bgcolor="bbffbb"
| 5 || October 7 || Diamondbacks|| 3–2 (10) || Axford (1–0) || Putz (0–1) ||  || 44,028 || 3–2

|- align="center" bgcolor="bbffbb"
| 1 || October 9 || Cardinals || 9–6 || Greinke (1–0) || García (0–1) || Axford (1) || 43,613 || 1–0
|- align="center" bgcolor="ffbbbb"
| 2 || October 10 || Cardinals || 12–3 || Lynn (1–0) || Marcum (0–1) || || 43,937 || 1–1
|- align="center" bgcolor="ffbbbb"
| 3 || October 12 || @ Cardinals || 4–3 || Carpenter (1–0) || Gallardo (0–1) || Motte (1) || 43,584 || 1–2
|- align="center" bgcolor="bbffbb"
| 4 || October 13 || @ Cardinals || 4–2 || Wolf (1–0) || Lohse (0–1) || Axford (2) || 45,606 || 2–2
|- align="center" bgcolor="ffbbbb"
| 5 || October 14 || @ Cardinals || 7–1 || Dotel (1–0) || Greinke (1–1) || Motte (2) || 46,904 || 2–3
|- align="center" bgcolor="ffbbbb"
| 6 || October 16 || Cardinals || 12–6 || Rzepczynski (1–0) || Marcum (0–2) ||  || 43,926 || 2–4

Roster

Transactions
 12/06 – Traded IF Brett Lawrie to Toronto Blue Jays for RHP Shaun Marcum.
 12/19 – Traded SS Alcides Escobar, OF Lorenzo Cain, RHP Jeremy Jeffress and  RHPJake Odorizzi to Kansas City Royals for RHP Zack Greinke, SS Yuniesky Betancourt and 2 million dollars.
 03/25 – Traded CF Chris Dickerson to New York Yankees for RHP Sergio Mitre.
 03/27 – Traded IF Cutter Dykstra to Washington Nationals for CF Nyjer Morgan.
 04/06 – Optioned RHP Brandon Kintzler to Nashville Sounds. <-> Called up RHP Marco Estrada from Nashville Sounds.
 04/11 – Designated OF Jeremy Reed for assignment. <-> Activated C Jonathan Lucroy from the 15-Day disabled list.
 04/11 – Placed RHP Takashi Saito on the 15-Day disabled list retroactive April 5, 2011. Left hamstring strain. <-> Called up RHP Brandon Kintzler from Nashville Sounds.
 04/13 – Outrighted OF Jeremy Reed to Nashville Sounds.
 04/19 – Placed RHP Shaun Marcum on the bereavement leave list. <-> Called up RHP Mike McClendon from Nashville Sounds.
 04/21 – Optioned RHP Mike McClendon to Nashville Sounds. <-> Activated RHP LaTroy Hawkins from the 15-Day disabled list.
 04/21 – Placed CF Nyjer Morgan on the 15-Day disabled list retroactive April 18, 2011. Deep thigh bruise.
 04/21 – Outrighted C George Kottaras to Nashville Sounds.
 04/22 – Activated RHP Shaun Marcum from the bereavement leave list.
 04/22 – Called up OF Brandon Boggs from Nashville Sounds.
 04/26 – Placed IF Erick Almonte on the 7-Day disabled list. Concussion. <-> Activated RF Corey Hart from the 15-Day disabled list.
 05/03 – Placed LHP Zach Braddock on the 15-Day disabled list. Sleep disorder. <-> Activated CF Nyjer Morgan from the 15-Day disabled list.
 05/04 – Outrighted OF Brandon Boggs to Nashville Sounds. <-> Activated RHP Zack Greinke from the 15-Day disabled list.
 05/05 – Optioned RHP Sean Green to Nashville Sounds. <-> Called up RHP Mike McClendon from Nashville Sounds.
 05/06 – Placed CF Nyjer Morgan on the 15-Day disabled list. Broken middle finger on left hand. <-> Called up OF Brandon Boggs from Nashville Sounds.
 05/10 – Placed IF Erick Almonte on the 15-Day disabled list.
 05/14 – Placed RHP Brandon Kintzler on the 15-Day disabled list retroactive to May 5, 2011. Right triceps tendonitis. <-> Called up RHP Tim Dillard from Nashville Sounds.
 05/17 – Placed LHP Mitch Stetter on the 15-Day disabled list retroactive May 15, 2011. Left hip injury. <-> Called up C Mike Rivera from Nashville Sounds.
 05/17 – Designated RHP Sean Green for assignment.
 05/19 – Outrighted RHP Sean Green to Nashville Sounds.
 05/23 – Claimed LHP Daniel Ray Herrera off waivers from Cincinnati Reds.
 05/23 – Optioned LHP Daniel Ray Herrera to Nashville Sounds.
 05/23 – Transferred LHP Manny Parra from the 15-Day disabled list to the 60-Day disabled list.
 05/25 – Claimed SS Josh Wilson off waivers from Arizona Diamondbacks.
 05/25 – Optioned SS Josh Wilson to Nashville Sounds.
 05/25 – Transferred RHP Takashi Saito from the 15-Day disabled list to the 60-Day disabled list.
 05/26 – Outrighted OF Brandon Boggs to Nashville Sounds.
 05/27 – Activated CF Nyjer Morgan from the 15-Day disabled list.
 05/27 – Outrighted C Mike Rivera to Nashville Sounds. <-> Called up SS Josh Wilson from Nashville Sounds.
 06/03 – Outrighted IF Erick Almonte to Nashville Sounds.
 06/04 – Optioned RHP Mike McClendon to Nashville Sounds. <-> Activated LHP Zach Braddock from the 15-Day disabled list.
 06/15 – Outrighted C Wil Nieves to Nashville Sounds. <-> Called up C George Kottaras from Nashville Sounds.
 06/16 – Optioned LHP Zach Braddock to Nashville Sounds. <-> Called up LHP Daniel Ray Herrera from Nashville Sounds.
 06/18 – Designated LHP Daniel Ray Herrera for assignment. <-> Called up RHP Mark DiFelice from Nashville Sounds.
 06/27 – Optioned RHP Mark DiFelice to Nashville Sounds. <-> Called up IF Mat Gamel from Nashville Sounds.
 06/27 – Designated RHP Sergio Mitre for assignment. <-> Called up LHP Zach Braddock from Nashville Sounds.
 06/27 – Outrighted Justin James to Nashville Sounds.
 06/30 – Traded RHP Sergio Mitre to New York Yankees for cash considerations.
 07/02 – Optioned RHP Tim Dillard to Nashville Sounds. <-> Activated RHP Takashi Saito from the 60-Day disabled list.
 07/10 – Optioned IF Mat Gamel to Nashville Sounds <-> Called up RHP Cody Scarpetta from Huntsville Stars.
 07/11 – Optioned RHP Cody Scarpetta to Huntsville Stars.
 07/13 – Traded cash considerations and 2 PTBNL to New York Mets for RHP Francisco Rodríguez.
 07/16 – Optioned LHP Zach Braddock to Nashville Sounds. <-> Called up RHP Tim Dillard from Nashville Sounds
 07/21 – Placed CF Carlos Gómez on the 15-Day disabled list. Fractured left clavicle. <-> Called up OF Brett Carroll from Nashville Sounds.
 07/27 – Traded C Wil Nieves to Atlanta Braves for cash considerations.
 07/28 – Placed 2B Rickie Weeks on the 15-Day disabled list. Sprained left ankle. <-> Called up 2B Eric Farris from Nashville Sounds.
 07/28 – Traded cash considerations to Tampa Bay Rays for 2B Felipe López.
 07/28 – Optioned 2B Felipe López to Nashville Sounds.
 07/29 – Optioned 2B Eric Farris to Nashville Sounds. <-> Called up 2B Felipe López from Nashville Sounds.
 07/30 – Designated OF Brett Carroll for assignment. <-> Traded OF Erik Komatsu to Washington Nationals for IF/OF Jerry Hairston Jr.
 07/30 – Transferred LHP Mitch Stetter from the 15-Day disabled list to the 60-Day disabled list.
 08/03 – OF Brett Carroll elected for free agency.
 08/10 – Placed LHP Chris Narveson on the 15-Day disabled list retroactive to August 7, 2011. Left thumb laceration. <-> Called up RHP Frankie de la Cruz from Nashville Sounds.
 08/22 – Designated 2B Felipe López for assignment. <-> Activated LHP Chris Narveson from the 15-Day disabled list.
 08/27 – Optioned RHP Tim Dillard to Nashville Sounds. <-> Called up 3B Taylor Green from Nashville Sounds.

Player stats
(through September 28, 2011)

Batting
Note: G = Games played; AB = At bats; R = Runs scored; H = Hits; 2B = Doubles; 3B = Triples; HR = Home runs; RBI = Runs batted in; TB = Total bases; BB = Walks; SO = Strikeouts; SB = Stolen bases; CS = Caught stealing; BA = Batting average; OBP = On-base percentage; SLG = Slugging percentage; OPS = On-base percentage plus slugging

Source:

Pitching
(through September 28, 2011)  

Note: G = Games pitched; GS = Games started; W = Wins; L = Losses; SV = Saves; QS = Quality starts; HLD = Holds; IP = Innings pitched; H = Hits allowed;  ER = Earned runs allowed; HR = Home runs allowed; BB = Walks allowed; SO = Strikeouts; K/9 = Strikeouts per 9 innings pitched; P/GS = Pitches per game started; WHIP = Walks plus hits per inning pitched; ERA = Earned run average

Source:

Farm system

The Brewers' farm system consisted of seven minor league affiliates in 2011.

References

External links
2011 Milwaukee Brewers season at Baseball Reference
2011 Milwaukee Brewers season Official Site

Milwaukee Brewers seasons
Milwaukee Brewers
National League Central champion seasons
Milwaukee Brew